Judi Bowker (born 6 April 1954) is an English film and television actress.

Biography
Bowker was born in Shawford, Hampshire, England, the daughter of Alfred J. Bowker and Ann Fairweather, who had married in 1947. The family moved to the British colony of Northern Rhodesia when Bowker was two, and lived there for eight years. She had many interests, including painting and riding. However, she was most interested in acting, and began to pursue her acting career after the family returned to England. Bowker first came to international attention as the star of The Adventures of Black Beauty (1972), a television series which was a continuation of the book. In an interview, Bowker stated that her experience in riding horses was probably the key to her being cast in the role. She also recalled how some of the Black Beauty episodes were set in springtime, but filmed in winter, so that sometimes she had to wear summer outfits in cold weather.

Also in 1972 Bowker starred as Saint Clare of Assisi in Franco Zeffirelli's Brother Sun, Sister Moon. The runner-up for the part was Lynne Frederick.

Her well-known film appearances are as Mina Harker in the 1977 film Count Dracula, Andromeda in the Ray Harryhausen film, Clash of the Titans (1981), and as the unhappily married Lady Olivia Lilburn in the Alan Bridges adaptation of Isabel Colegate's novel The Shooting Party (1985).

She has appeared in numerous theatre productions including major roles in Hedda Gabler, Macbeth, Ivanov, A Midsummer Night's Dream, Three Sisters, and in her husband Harry Meacher's adaptation of Sherlock Holmes.

She was cast as a narrator for a BBC audiobook adaptation of the work of P. D. James in 2018.

Personal life
Bowker has been married to the actor Harry Meacher since 1979. They live in Highgate.

Filmography
 Brother Sun, Sister Moon (1972)
 East of Elephant Rock (1977)
 Clash of the Titans (1981) – Andromeda
 The Shooting Party (1985)
 10 Arenas of Marwood (2011)
 Feast of Varanasi (2016)

Television
 The Adventures of Black Beauty (1972) – TV series
 Dr. Jekyll and Mr. Hyde (1973)
 South Riding (1974)
 In This House of Brede (1975)
 Play for Today (1975) – two episodes
 The Picture of Dorian Gray (1976)
 Hindle Wakes (1976)
 Count Dracula (1977)
 Tales of the Unexpected, "The Best of Everything" (1981) – one episode
 Wilfred and Eileen (1981)
 Little Miss Perkins (1982)
 Ellis Island (1984) – TV miniseries
 Anna Karenina (1985)
 Sins (1986) – TV miniseries
 Worlds Beyond, "The Haunted Garden" (1987) – one episode
 Menace Unseen (1988) – TV miniseries
 Kurtulus (1994) – TV miniseries
 The Bill (series 19) (2003) – TV series

Theatre
 Macbeth (1978) – National Theatre, Olivier Theatre
 Hedda Gabler (1998) – Pentameters, Inner London
 Hay Fever (2016) – Logos Theater
 Copperfield (2021) – Lauderdale House

References

External links 
 

1954 births
English film actresses
English television actresses
Living people
Actors from Winchester